Paul Glynn (1928) is a Marist missionary priest and writer from Australia. He is the author of several books, including The Song of Nagasaki (1988) and The Smile of the Ragpicker (1992), both best-sellers and translated into several languages. He has devoted a lifetime to reconciliation and friendship between Australia and Japan, the two former wartime enemies.

Biography
Paul Glynn is an Australian Marist missionary priest and writer. He graduated from Southern Cross University; in 2010 the school awarded him an honorary doctorate for his reconciliation work with Japan.  He lived in Japan for over 20 years, learning the country's language and culture through Buddhist texts. There he wrote A Song for Nagasaki, a book recounting the life of Takashi Nagai, a radiologist who converted to Catholicism and survived the atomic bomb dropped on Nagasaski. Paul Glynn is also the author of The Smile of a Ragpicker and Like a Samurai – the Tony Glynn Story (see Tony Glynn).

Paul Glynn has been a Catholic priest since 1953. He has devoted a lifetime to reconciliation and friendship between Australia and Japan, the two former wartime foes. He was inspired to follow Padre Lionel Marsden, a former prisoner-of-war of the Japanese on the Burma Railway, to work for reconciliation with the people of Japan. He subsequently helped his brother Tony, who was also a promoter of reconciliation with Japan. He is a recipient of the Order of the Rising Sun from the Japanese government and the Medal of the Order of Australia (OAM) from the Australian government for reconciliation work between Japan and Australia. He initiated Australia's first Sister City relationship with a Japanese city – between Yamato Takada in Nara Prefecture and Lismore in northern New South Wales – half a century ago.

Publications
 A Song for Nagasaki: The Story of Takashi Nagai: Scientist, Convert, and Survivor of the Atomic Bomb (with a forewod by Shusaku Endo), Ignatius Press, 2009, 267 p.  ;  (1st edition: Hunters Hill, New South Wales, Catholic Book Club, 1988) ;  Requiem pour Nagasaki, Nouvelle Cité, Montrouge, 1994  ;  Un canto per Nagasaki, Little Red Apple Publishing, 1996, 169 pages  ;  ;  Requiem por Nagasaki, Co-labora Consulting Estrategico  ;  ;  Paul Glynn, Gregor Neonbasu, Sebuah lagu untuk Nagasaki, Yayasan Mawar Sejati (Australia), 1999, 181 p.
 (with Tōru Matsui) The smile of a ragpicker, 2nd edition, Marist Fathers Books, 1992, 196 p.  ;  ;  Le sourire de Satoko-San, une jeune femme chez les chiffonniers (or Le sourire de Satoko-San, la sœur des chiffonniers, Collection « Racines », Étouvans, Espace et Documents, 1996, 240 p.
 Healing Fire from Frozen Earth: Lourdes and the Third Millennium, Marist Fathers Books, 2002, 195 p.  ; 
 Healing Fire of Christ: Reflections on Modern Miracles – Knock, Lourdes, Fatima, Ignatius Press, 2003, 260 p.  ; 
 Like a Samurai: The Tony Glynn Story, Marist Fathers Books, 2008,  ; 
 Psalms: Songs for the Way Home, E.J. Dwyer, 1997,  ; 
 Hearers of Silent Music, Catholic Book Club of Australia, 36 p.  ; 
 Thank you Brother Fire, Catholic Book Club, 1984,  ; 
 The Wayside Stream: About Reconciliation in Families, Communities and Between, Marist Fathers Books, 2003,  ;

Notes and references

1928 births
Australian writers
Australian Roman Catholic missionaries
Australian Roman Catholic priests
Roman Catholic missionaries in Japan
Living people
Australian expatriates in Japan
Southern Cross University alumni
Recipients of the Medal of the Order of Australia